Salt City SC (formerly Ogden City SC) is an American soccer club competing in USL League Two. The team is run by Utah Youth Soccer Association, the first semi-pro  team run by a statewide youth soccer organization.

Year-by-year

Stadia
Spence Eccles Ogden Community Sports Complex, Ogden, Utah (2018-2021)
Zions Bank Real Academy, Herriman, Utah (2022–present)

External links
Official website

References

USL League Two teams
Soccer clubs in Utah
2017 establishments in Utah
Association football clubs established in 2017